Joseph Freiherr von Sonnenfels (1732 – 25 April 1817) was an Austrian and German jurist and novelist. He was among the leaders of the Illuminati movement in Austria, and a close friend and patron of Mozart. He is also the dedicatee of Ludwig van Beethoven's Piano Sonata No. 15, Op. 28, which was published in 1801.

Life
He was born in Nikolsburg/Mikulov, Moravia, a son of Perlin Lipmann (1705–1768), chief rabbi of Brandenburg. Perlin Lipmann and his children converted to Catholicism some time between 1735–1741. Joseph, who was baptized in his early youth, received his elementary education at the gymnasium of his native town Nikolsburg, and then studied philosophy at the University of Vienna. In 1749, he joined the regiment "Deutschmeister" as a private, advancing to the rank of corporal. On his discharge in 1754, he took a course in law at the University of Vienna and established himself as a counselor at law in the Austrian capital. From 1761 to 1763, he officiated as secretary of the Austrian "Arcierengarde". In 1763, he was appointed professor of political science at the University of Vienna, twice acting as rector magnificus. In 1779, he received the title of "Wirklicher Hofrath", and was in 1810 elected president of the Academy of Sciences, a position which he held until his death in Vienna.

From 1765 to 1767 and from 1769 to 1775 Sonnenfels was editor of "Der Mann ohne Vorurtheil", in which paper he defended the liberal tendencies in literature. He improved the Vienna stage especially through his critical work Briefe über die Wienerische Schaubühne, in which he attacked the harlequin of the Vienna theater, causing this figure to be eliminated from the personnel of the stage.

He was chiefly instrumental in bringing about the abolition of torture in Austria (1776). Sonnenfels' attitude toward Lessing placed the former in a very unfavorable light, as it was due to his intrigues and jealousy that Lessing was not called to Vienna. Sonnenfels was severely condemned for his action in this affair. In 1817, Sonnenfels was elected a member of the American Philosophical Society in Philadelphia.

Works 

 Specimen Juris Germanici de Remediis Juris, Juri Romano Incognitis, Vienna, 1757.
 Ankündigung einer Teutschen Gesellschaft in Wien, Vienna 1761.
 
 Grundsätze der Polizei, Handlung und Finanzwissenschaft, Vienna 1765–67 (8th ed. 1819).
 
 
 Briefe über die Wienerische Schaubühne, Vienna 1768 (reedited by Sauer, Vienna 1884).
 Von der Verwandlung der Domänen in Bauerngüter, Vienna 1773.
 
 
 
 
 
 Abhandlung über die Aufhebung der Wuchergesetze, Vienna, 1791.
 
 
 Ueber die Stimmenmehrheit bei Criminalurtheilen, Vienna, 1801.
 

His Gesammelte Werke appeared in 10 volumes (Vienna, 1783–87), and contained most of his belletristic works, poems, and dramas.

References

Sources
 
 The Masonic Thread of Mozart by Katherine Thomson (page 16). Published in London 1977.

External links

1732 births
1817 deaths
18th-century Austrian Jews
Austrian jurists
18th-century Austrian novelists
Austrian male novelists
Barons of Austria
Austrian Christians
People from Mikulov
Converts to Roman Catholicism from Judaism
Austrian Jews
Czech Roman Catholics
18th-century male writers
Cameralism